Flirtation is a 1934 American drama film directed by Leo Birinsky and starring Jeanette Loff, Ben Alexander and Arthur Tracy. A young man from the country moves to the city and falls in love with a burlesque dancer.

Cast
 Jeanette Loff as Nancy Poole 
 Ben Alexander as Dudley 
 Arthur Tracy as The Street Singer 
 Emma Dunn as Mrs. Poole 
 Franklin Pangborn as Veterinarian 
 Helen MacKellar as Mrs. Smith 
 Cissy Fitzgerald as Mrs. Nerps 
 William Pawley as Gangster

References

Bibliography
 Clifford McCarty. Film Composers in America: A Filmography, 1911-1970. Oxford University Press, 2000.

External links
 

1934 films
1934 drama films
American drama films
Films directed by Leo Birinsky
1930s English-language films
1930s American films